The National Examination Council (also known as NECO) is an examination body in Nigeria that conducts the Senior Secondary Certificate Examination and the General Certificate in Education in June/July and November/December respectively.

History 

NECO was created by former Head of State Abdulsalami Abubakar in April 1999.
It was the first Federal organization to offer subsidized registration to academic candidates in Nigeria.

Mandates 

NECO was mandated to take over the responsibilities of the National Board of Education Measurement (NBEM). Its maiden examination took place in mid-2000.

Administration 

When it was headed by Abubakar M. Gana, appointed by the President under section 9(1) of its establishing Act.
It has six departments, each headed by a director. Each Department has divisions, composed of units. A team of directors and a registrar are the governing body, which is headed by chair Abubakar Mohammed.

Senior Secondary Certificate Examination (internal and external) 

Nigeria offers six years of basic education, three years of junior secondary education, three years of senior secondary education, and four years of tertiary education. Mathematics and English language are compulsory though Mathematics may not be required for some courses in higher institutions.

Basic Education Certificate Examination (BECE) 

Basic Education Certificate Examination (BECE) is the main examination to qualify students for admission into secondary and vocational schools in Ghana and Nigeria. It is written after three years of junior high school education.

National Common Entrance Examination 

The National Common Entrance Examination is administered to pupils in their 6th year of basic education for admission into Federal Unity Colleges. Two examinations are held annually.

On 15 July 2013, it was rumouroed that there were plans made by the federal government of Nigeria to remove the National Examination Council (NECO) From the Nigeria Education System due to low and average passing percentage from candidates across the state in Nigeria. The government swiftly debunked those claims by the then minister of education Mr Nyesom Wike.

Structure of the Examination

The National Common Entrance Examination Questions consist of the following:

PAPER I

Part A – Mathematics and General Science 
Part B – English and Social Studies

PAPER II
Part A – Quantitative and Vocational Aptitude 
Part B – Verbal Aptitude

References

External links 
 
NECO Job Portal
NECO Result Portal
List Of NECO Office Address Nationwide
How to check NECO Result

Education in Nigeria
1999 establishments in Nigeria
Educational institutions established in 1999
Educational organizations based in Africa
Qualifications awarding bodies
School examinations
Secondary school qualifications